Lakota Local School District may refer to:

Lakota Local School District (Butler County), Ohio
Lakota Local School District (Sandusky County), Sandusky County, Ohio